Adrien Marquet (6 October 1884 – 3 February 1955) was a socialist mayor of Bordeaux who turned to the far right.

Career
Marquet was born in Bordeaux and became its socialist mayor in 1925. In 1933, he was expelled from the French Section of the Workers' International (SFIO). The expulsion involved an address to the SFIO in which he emphasized order and authority as necessary to win the masses; his position frightened Léon Blum. He and Marcel Déat then formed the Neosocialists. Later, he declared the faction to be decidedly anti-Marxist. He eventually abandoned any form of socialism and briefly served as Minister of the Interior for Philippe Pétain. Later, like  Déat, he became a supporter of Pierre Laval.

See also
 List of mayors of Bordeaux

References

1880s births
1955 deaths
Politicians from Bordeaux
French Section of the Workers' International politicians
Socialist Party of France – Jean Jaurès Union politicians
French interior ministers
Government ministers of France
Members of the 13th Chamber of Deputies of the French Third Republic
Members of the 14th Chamber of Deputies of the French Third Republic
Members of the 15th Chamber of Deputies of the French Third Republic
Members of the 16th Chamber of Deputies of the French Third Republic
People of Vichy France
Mayors of Bordeaux
French neo-socialists
French anti-communists
French dentists
20th-century dentists